The Lawa River is a river in East Kalimantan province, Borneo island, Indonesia, about  northwest of Balikpapan. The indigenous communities of Lotaq and Mejaun (The Dayaks) are situated near its source.

Geography
The river flows in the eastern area of Borneo with predominantly tropical rainforest climate (designated as Af in the Köppen-Geiger climate classification). The wettest month is November, with an average of  rainfall, and the driest is August, with a  rainfall.

See also
List of rivers of Indonesia
List of rivers of Kalimantan

References

West Kutai Regency
Rivers of East Kalimantan
Rivers of Indonesia